Giovanni Acerbi was the second of four s built for the Italian  (Royal Navy) during World War I.

Design

They had a crew of 98 officers and enlisted men. The ships were powered by two steam turbines, with steam provided by four Thornycroft water-tube boilers.

Giovanni Acerbi was armed with a main battery of six  guns. Her light armament consisted of a pair of  anti-aircraft guns and two  machine guns. She was also equipped with four  torpedo tubes in two twin launchers, one on each side of the ship. The ship also carried ten naval mines.

Service history
Giovanni Acerbi was built at the  shipyard in Sestri Ponente, and was launched on 14 February 1917.

The ship was sunk by British aircraft on 4 April 1941 in the port of Massawa in Italian Eritrea.

Notes

References
 
 

 
 

 
World War I naval ships of Italy
Ships built in Italy
Ships built by Cantieri navali Odero
1917 ships
World War II torpedo boats of Italy
Maritime incidents in April 1941
Ships sunk by British aircraft
Destroyers sunk by aircraft